Doctors' Building (Sakhteman Pezeshkan) is an Iranian Drama and Comedy series. The series is directed by Soroush Sehhat.

Storyline 
Nima Afshar (Behnam Tashakkor), a psychologist, lives with her wife (Farnaz Rahnama) that his a former patient,and lives in the neighborhood of his parents. The stories in the series deal with the inconvenience life of Nima. Among his problems with various patients and financial problems arising from paying rent, various installments, his ex-wife's (Mona Farjad) Mahr, his constant efforts to maintain peace and tranquility between his parents (Hushang Harirchiyan) and his careless brother (Hooman Barghnavard), his obsessive wife, and finally his secretary's (Shaghayegh Dehghan) intolerance.

Cast 

 Behnam Tashakkor - Nima Afshar
 Hooman Barghnavard - Nasser Afshar
 Hushang Harirchiyan - FaridAfshar
 Farnaz Rahnama - Nazanin Farahmand
 Shaghayegh Dehghan - Parastoo Shirzad
 Bijan Banafshehkhah - Hooman Malekzadeh
 Parvin Ghaem Maghami - Mahbobeh
 Mehran Rajabi
 Omid Rohani - Amirmansour sohrabi
 Naeimeh Nezamdoost - Nahal
 Sepand Amirsoleimani
 Mona Farjad- Katayon Borhannejad
 Mohammad Shiri - Mohammadi
 Pejman Jamshidi
 Rambod Javan
 Hadis Mir Amini
 Sirous Ebrahim Zadeh - Sirius farzaneh
 Gholamhussein Lotfi
 Amir Baradaran
 Ali Barghi
 Sanaz Zarrinmehr
 Marjan Sepehri - Nazafarin mahbob
 Majid Shahryari - majid jozini
 Reza Karimi - kasra Kamalimotlagh

References

External links
 

2010s Iranian television series
Iranian comedy television series
Iranian drama television series